Kohistan ("Land of Mountains"), also called Indus Kohistan, was an administrative district within the Hazara region of Khyber Pakhtunkhwa Province in Pakistan that was bifurcated into Upper Kohistan and Lower Kohistan in 2014, and Kolai-Palas in 2017. Geographically, Kohistan stretched from the border with Gilgit-Baltistan in the north, in the east by Mansehra District, in the south by Battagram District, and on the west by Shangla and Swat districts.

Geography 
The District lied between 34° 54′ and 35° 52′ north latitudes and 72° 43′ and 73° 57′ east longitudes. It was bounded on the north by the Diamer District of Gilgit-Baltistan, on the southeast by Manshera District, while it shared its borders with Kaghan Valley of the Mansehra District in the east, on the south by Battagram District and on the west by Shangla and Swat Districts.

Kohistan is where the Hindukush, Karakorum and Himalayan Mountain systems meet and serve as a natural boundary for environmental regions in the chains of the Himalayas, Karakoram and Hindu Kush mountains. This uniqueness of the mountains system also results in rich flora and fauna and therefore gives home to unique species such as the western tragopan pheasant and the snow leopard.

Education 
The literacy rate of the District among the population aged 10 years and above is 11.1%: male 17.23% and female 2.95%. The proportion of working or employed population to population aged 10 years and above is 26.47% which is 70.53% of the total labor force. Out of the total employed population, 71.60% are self-employed, 10.68% work as employees, and 17.32% are unpaid family helper.

Kohistan's literacy rate is amongst the lowest in Pakistan and hovers around 20%. It has the lowest Human Development Index of all districts in the Khyber Pakhtunkhwa.

See also 
 Upper Kohistan District
 Lower Kohistan District
 Kolai-Palas District

References

 
Districts of Khyber Pakhtunkhwa
Hindu Kush